Darısekisi is a village in the Mersin Province, Turkey. It's part of Toroslar district (which is an intracity district within Mersin city). The village is situated in the Taurus Mountains. The population of the village was 251 as of 2012.

References

Villages in Toroslar District